David Srangnanaok is a Thai professional footballer.

References

1987 births
Living people
David Srangnanaok
David Srangnanaok
David Srangnanaok
Association football forwards